The 1972 Campeonato Paulista da Divisão Especial de Futebol Profissional, organized by the Federação Paulista de Futebol, was the 71st season of São Paulo's top professional football league. Palmeiras won the title for the 16th time. no teams were relegated and the top scorer was São Paulo's Toninho Guerreiro with 17 goals.

Championship
Much like in the previous year, a preliminary phase was disputed before the championship proper, in which all teams played against each other twice and the six best teams qualified into the main championship. That phase was to be disputed in the second semester of 1971, by the teams that had been eliminated in that phase in the previous year, the six worst-placed teams in the main championship and Marília, that had been promoted from the Second Level. 

In the championship proper, each team played against the others twice, and the team with the most points won the title.

Preliminary phase

League table

Results

Championship proper

League table

Results

Top Scores

References

Campeonato Paulista seasons
Paulista